Comedy was the second official album by Black, released in 1988. It reached No.32 in the UK Albums Chart.

Track listing
All songs written by Colin Vearncombe

 "The Big One" 
 "I Can Laugh About It Now" 
 "Whatever People Say You Are" 
 "You're a Big Girl Now"  
 "Let Me Watch You Make Love"  
 "Hey, I Was Right, You Were Wrong!" 
 "All We Need Is the Money"  
 "You Don't Always Do What's Best for You"  
 "Now You're Gone"  
 "No-One, None, Nothing" 
 "It's Not Over Yet"  
 "Paradise Lost"

Personnel
Black - guitar, vocals
Gordon Morgan, Robin Millar – guitar
Steve Pearce – bass guitar
Dave Dix, Peter Adams – keyboards
Guy Richman – drums
Martin Ditcham – percussion
Martin Green – saxophone
Steve Sidwell – trumpet
Dave Dix – programming
Sara Lamarra, Tina Labrinski, Derek Green – backing vocals
Gavin Harrison – drums on "The Big One" and "It's not over yet".
Simeon Jones – harmonica on "Let Me Watch You Make Love"
Technical
Dave Anderson - recording engineer
Mike Pela - mixing engineer
Perry Ogden - photography

Sales and certifications

References

 

1988 albums
A&M Records albums
Black (singer) albums
Albums produced by Robin Millar